The Römer 2-4-6 is a Gothic timbered house constructed in 1289. It is one of the oldest timbered houses in Germany and is located in the historical old German town of Limburg an der Lahn.

In its garden, a mikvah was found.

Buildings and structures completed in 1289
Buildings and structures in Limburg-Weilburg
Gothic architecture in Germany
Houses in Germany